The Gare de Morgny (Morgny station) is a railway station in the commune of Morgny-la-Pommeraye in the Seine-Maritime department, France.  The station is served by TER Normandie and TER Hauts-de-France trains from Amiens to Rouen.

References

Railway stations in Seine-Maritime